Natale a Miami is a 2005 Italian comedy film directed by Neri Parenti.

Cast

See also
 List of Christmas films

References

External links

2005 films
Films directed by Neri Parenti
Films scored by Bruno Zambrini
Films set in Miami
2000s Italian-language films
2005 comedy films
2000s Christmas comedy films
Italian Christmas comedy films
2000s Italian films
Foreign films set in the United States